is a 2003 Japanese film directed by Hideyuki Hirayama.

Cast
 Yosuke Kubozuka as Shiro-Tokisada Amakusa
 Kumiko Asō as Clara Oshina 
 Tetta Sugimoto as Yorinobu Tokugawa
 Arata Furuta as Inshun Hozoin
 Masaya Kato as Mataemon Araki
 Kyozo Nagatsuka as Musashi Miyamoto
 Kōichi Satō as Jubei Yagyu
 Akira Emoto
 Arata Furuta as Hozoin Inshun
 Jun Kunimura
 Katsuo Nakamura as Yagyu Tajima-no-Kami Munenori
 Yōji Tanaka

References

External links
 

2003 films
Films directed by Hideyuki Hirayama
2010s Japanese films